Peter Nicolaj Arbo  (16 November 1768 – 12 September 1827) was a Norwegian-Danish timber trader and landowner. He owned the estates Aldershvile, Lundbygård and Oremandsgaard in Denmark and Gulskogen Manor in Norway.

Early life
Arbo was born in Strømsø, Drammen, Norway. His parents were Johannes Petersen Arbo and Anne Cathrine Arbo née Friisenberg.

Career
Arbo entered Collett & Sæn though his marriage to Anne Cathrine Collett. Founded by James Collett in Christiania in the 1690s, it had become the largest timber trading company in Norway and was also active in the shipping industry. Arbo later moved to Copenhagen where he was also active in the timber industry.

Property
Arbo acquired Gulskogen Manor at Drammen in Norway in 1794.

He owned the Peschier House at Holmens Kanal 12 in Copenhagen as well as the country house Villa Sans Souci in Frederiksberg. In 1804, he purchased Aldershvile in Bagsværd. In 1824, e acquired the estates Lundbygård and Oremandsgaard at Præstø on the southern part of Zealand.

Further reading
 Alf Collett: Familien Collett og Christianialiv i gamle dage, J.W. Cappelens Forlag, 1915

References

External links

 Peter Nicolaj Arbo at geni.com

Danish businesspeople in timber
Norwegian merchants
19th-century Danish landowners
Norwegian landowners
Norwegian emigrants to Denmark
1768 births
1827 deaths
18th-century Norwegian businesspeople
18th-century Danish businesspeople
19th-century Norwegian businesspeople
19th-century Danish businesspeople